The 1993 Central Michigan Chippewas football team represented Central Michigan University in the Mid-American Conference (MAC) during the 1993 NCAA Division I-A football season.  In their 16th season under head coach Herb Deromedi, the Chippewas compiled a 5–6 record (4–3 against MAC opponents), finished in fourth place in the MAC, and outscored their opponents, 275 to 244.  The team played its home games in Kelly/Shorts Stadium in Mount Pleasant, Michigan, with attendance of 93,295 in five home games.

The team's statistical leaders included quarterback Joe Youngblood with 2,466 passing yards, tailback Brian Pruitt with 944 rushing yards, and flanker D. J. Reid with 693 receiving yards. Youngblood was named as Central Michigan's most valuable player for the second consecutive year. Offensive lineman Darrell McCaul, placekicker Chuck Selinger, and linebacker Mike Kyler were selected as first-team All-MAC players.

In March 1994, Herb Deromedi quit his position as Central Michigan's head football coach to become the school's athletic director. Deromedi had hoped to continue coaching the football team, but the university administration required him to choose between coaching or taking on the duties of athletic director.  He said at the time, "To be honest, I was disappointed I wasn't given the opportunity to coach the 1994 season." In 16 years as head coach, Deromedi compiled a 110–55–10 record. An alumnus of the University of Michigan, he was inducted into the College Football Hall of Fame in 2007.

Schedule

References

Central Michigan
Central Michigan Chippewas football seasons
Central Michigan Chippewas football